Kadomo is an island within the Mamanuca Islands of Fiji in the South Pacific. The islands are a part of the Fiji's Western Division.

Geography
Kadomo a high volcanic island. It is Set just 50 kilometers (31 miles) from the Fiji's Nadi International Airport.

References

External links

Islands of Fiji
Mamanuca Islands